Repellent can refer to:

 Insect repellent
 Animal repellent
 Water repellent